Simon Murphy (1949 – 7 April 1997) was an Irish hurler and Gaelic footballer. At club level he played with St Michael's, Blascktock and University College Cork and was also a member of the Cork senior hurling team. In spite of a brief senior career, he was one of the most decorated players of his generation having won seven All-Ireland medals at various levels in both codes between 1967 and 1972.

Career

Murphy studied at Presentation Brothers College in Cork where he was a noted athlete. He won the bronze medal in the high jump in the Willwood Tailteann Games in 1963. Around his time Murphy also began a remarkable run of success as a hurler and Gaelic football with Blackrock and its sister club St Michael's, winning numerous juvenile and underage honours. He eventually progressed onto the club's top adult teams and won an All-Ireland Club Championship title with Blackrock in 1972. He also lined out with University College Cork and was a Fitzgibbon Cup and Sigerson Cup medal-winner during his tenure there. Murphy first appeared on the inter-county scene as a dual player at minor level. He won four Munster minor medals, two in each code, across 1966 and 1967 while he was also a dual All-Ireland medallist in 1967 after Cork completed the double. Further success followed at under-21 level, with Murphy never losing a game and collecting three successive All-Ireland U21HC medals during his three seasons in the grade. He once again completed the double by also claiming an All-Ireland U21FC title in 1970. Murphy joined the Cork senior hurling team during their successful 1969-70 National League campaign before ending the season with an All-Ireland SHC title after coming on as a substitute in the final against Wexford in what was his only championship appearance. He claimed a second National League winners' medal in 1972 before announcing his complete retirement from club and inter-county activity.

Death

Murphy died from cancer on 7 April 1997, aged 47.

Honours

St Michael's
Cork Intermediate Football Championship: 1969

Blackrock
All-Ireland Senior Club Hurling Championship: 1972
Munster Senior Club Hurling Championship: 1971
Cork Senior Hurling Championship: 1971

University College Cork
Munster Senior Club Football Championship: 1971
Cork Senior Football Championship: 1969
Fitzgibbon Cup: 1969
Sigerson Cup: 1970

Cork
All-Ireland Senior Hurling Championship: 1970
Munster Senior Hurling Championship: 1970
National Hurling League: 1969-70, 1971-72
Munster Junior Football Championship: 1970
All-Ireland Under-21 Football Championship: 1970
All-Ireland Under-21 Hurling Championship: 1968, 1969, 1970
Munster Under-21 Football Championship: 1970
Munster Under-21 Hurling Championship: 1968, 1969, 1970
All-Ireland Minor Hurling Championship: 1967
All-Ireland Minor Football Championship: 1967
Munster Minor Hurling Championship: 1966, 1967
Munster Minor Football Championship: 1966, 1967

References

1949 births
1997 deaths
Dual players
Blackrock National Hurling Club hurlers
St Michael's (Cork) Gaelic footballers
UCC hurlers
UCC Gaelic footballers
Cork inter-county hurlers
Cork inter-county Gaelic footballers
All-Ireland Senior Hurling Championship winners